Crocodile on the Sandbank is a historical mystery novel by Elizabeth Peters, first published in 1975. It is the first in the Amelia Peabody series of novels and takes place in 1884-1885.

Plot summary

Amelia Peabody is left a wealthy orphan after the death of her studious father, who has left her everything in his will because she is the only one of his children who shared his interests, namely history and archaeology.  The inheritance enables her to travel abroad in order to follow her enthusiasm for antiquities.

Amelia, a determined and unorthodox English woman, supports women's suffrage and believes she will never marry. (She's convinced she is unattractive and will neither submit to a man nor rule one.) In Rome she meets the destitute Evelyn Forbes, whose titled family have cast her off after she eloped with, then was abandoned by, an Italian art teacher.  Amelia takes Evelyn under her wing and employs her as a companion.  They travel together to Egypt, where they encounter the Emerson brothers, Radcliffe and Walter, archaeologist and philologist respectively, and where Amelia falls in love with pyramids.

Amelia and Evelyn decide to travel up the Nile, stopping at various sites along the way.  When they reach Amarna, they discover the Emersons excavating the city which for a while was the capital of Egypt under the mysterious Akhenaten.

Amelia and Radcliffe Emerson loathe one another on sight, but after he is taken ill and she helps to keep his excavation going, they grudgingly begin to respect one another. Evelyn is attracted to Walter, but is convinced she will never marry because of her soiled reputation.

Things get complicated when Evelyn's cousin Lucas shows up at the remote site with a story about her grandfather's death, his (Lucas') inheritance, and a proposal of marriage. Amidst the romantic entanglements and attempts to continue the excavation, Emerson and Amelia must also deal with the nocturnal visitations of a mummy that walks moaning through the desert.

Once the mystery is solved, Amelia plans to stay in Egypt and conduct her own archaeological expeditions, with Emerson at her side ... as her advisor and as her husband.

The tone of the novel (as well as the rest of the series) is humorous to the point of parody and pokes fun at many of the period's mores and stereotypes, as well as the sensationalist novels popular at the time.

Background
Elizabeth Peters' background in Egyptology lends authenticity to the settings and the history presented in the novel, particularly the method of travel by boat ("dahabeeyah") down the Nile that was popular at the time, as well as the customs of the various cultures.

Title
The title of the book, like many of the Amelia Peabody novels, comes from an ancient Egyptian text:
The love of my beloved is on yonder side
A width of water is between us
And a crocodile waiteth on the sandbank.
(Ancient Egyptian love poem, from the front matter of the paperback edition.)

References

Fiction set in 1884
Fiction set in 1885
1975 American novels
Amelia Peabody
American historical novels
Novels about orphans
Novels set in Egypt
Novels set in the 1880s
Historical mystery novels